Patrick Joseph Tiernan (8 March 1942 – 31 March 1994) was an Australian politician who represented the South Australian House of Assembly seat of Torrens from 1993 to 1994 for the Liberal Party.

References

1942 births
1994 deaths
Members of the South Australian House of Assembly
Liberal Party of Australia members of the Parliament of South Australia
20th-century Australian politicians